Ivona Jezierska (born 1958) is a Polish-American Woman FIDE master (WFM) (1985).

Biography
In 1978, Ivona Jezierska took the 5th place in the Polish Women's Chess Championship. In the early 1980s, she moved to the United States. Ivona Jezierska participated in several U.S. Women's Chess Championships. In 1995, Ivona Jezierska participated in Women's World Chess Championship Interzonal Tournament in Chişinău where ranked 50th place.

Ivona Jezierska played for United States in the Women's Chess Olympiads:
 In 1984, at third board in the 26th Chess Olympiad (women) in Thessaloniki (+3, =2, -5),
 In 1986, at second board in the 27th Chess Olympiad (women) in Dubai (+7, =3, -2).

Since mid-2000, she rarely participate in chess tournaments.

References

External links
 
 
 
 

1958 births
Living people
American female chess players
Polish female chess players
Chess Woman FIDE Masters
Chess Olympiad competitors
21st-century American women